Paul Andrew Arthurson, Lord Arthurson (born 16 December 1964) is a Senator of the College of Justice, appointed in March 2017. He previously served as a sheriff, since 2005, and a temporary judge of the Court of Session, since 2013. He is a graduate of the University of Edinburgh. He was admitted to the Faculty of Advocates in 1991 and was appointed Queen's Counsel (QC) in Scotland in 2005

References

Living people
Alumni of the University of Dundee
Scottish King's Counsel
Arthurson
Year of birth missing (living people)
1964 births
Alumni of the University of Edinburgh
Alumni of Worcester College, Oxford
Members of the Faculty of Advocates